Songs of the Great Dominion was a pioneering anthology of Canadian poetry published in 1889. The book's full title was Songs of the Great Dominion: Voices from the Forests and Waters, the Settlements and Cities of Canada. The collection was selected and edited by William Douw Lighthall of Montreal. It was published in London, England by the firm of Walter Scott, as part of its "Windsor Series" of anthologies.

The book introduced Canadian and English audiences to a new generation of Canadian writers. It marked the first publication in book form for several poets, including Bliss Carman, Pauline Johnson, and Duncan Campbell Scott.

History

Lighthall was asked to put together an anthology for Walter Scott by poet William Sharp, who was working as an editor for the firm. Independently, freelance editor Ernest Rhys made the same proposal on behalf of Walter Scott to Canadian poet Charles G.D. Roberts. When the mixup was revealed, Roberts withdrew, but promised Lighthall "whatever assistance you might permit me to be." Roberts suggested several writers for inclusion, including his cousin Barry Straton and his sister Elizabeth (both of whom were included).

"Supplied with a ringing introduction which echoes with patriotic sentiment and lyrical praise for Canada," says the Canadian Encyclopedia, "this is a collection of confident poetry truly representative of the national and literary self-respect of the emergent Dominion."

In his introduction, Lighthall was lavish in his praise of Roberts. "The foremost name in Canadian song at the present day is that of Charles George Douglas Roberts," he declared. Immediately after Roberts Lighthall talked of Charles Sangster, whom he called Canada's "first important national poet" and "a kind of Wordsworth."

Lighthall was also lavish in praising the reputation of Isabella Valancy Crawford, whose one book of poetry had failed to sell in 1884, and who had died neglected in 1887 (a "sad story of unrecognized genius and death," as he put it). While gently mocking her title, Lighthall pronounced Crawford's book, Old Spookse's Pass, Malcolm's Katie, and Other Poems, to be "the most striking volume" of Canadian poetry after Roberts's, and "even more boldly new" than his. After her death, he added, "Miss Crawford's work was, in fact, seen to be phenomenal."

In a review of Songs of the Great Dominion in the September 28, 1889, Athenæum, Theodore Watts-Dunton singled out Pauline Johnson for special praise, calling her “the most interesting English poetess now living” and quoting her poem "In the Shadows" in full. Johnson (who had not yet published a book) considered this to be a big boost for her career, and felt herself "indebted" for the inclusion and the review.

One person who was unhappy with the selection was William Wilfred Campbell. "I have been cruelly misrepresented by a willful choice of my poorest work," Campbell wrote to a friend."

"The anthology is noteworthy for its attempt to include some French Canadian poetry in the appendix as well as some folksongs in translation, and for its recognition of a distinct Indian element in Canadian writing."

Walter Scott republished the anthology in 1892 under the title, Canadian Poems and Lays: Selections of native verse reflecting the seasons, legends, and life of the Dominion.

Contents

Contents of the 1889 edition:

Introduction [William Douw Lighthall] /xxi
Entry of the Minstrels (from Masque of the Minstrels), Arthur J. Lockhart /xxxix

I. The Imperial Spirit
Hastings (from Merlin and Other Poems), John Reade /3
Advance of the Empire (from Jubilee Poems), Mary Barry Smith /5
Canada to England, Anonymous /7
Empire First, Jean-Talon L'Espérance ("Laclède") /10
The Canadians on the Nile (from Poems), William Wye Smith /11

II. The New Nationality
Dominion Day, "Fidelis" / 15
Canada (from In Divers Tones), Charles G.D. Roberts /18
The Confused Dawn (from Thoughts, Moods, and Ideals), William Douw Lighthall /21
National Hymn (from Thoughts, Moods, and Ideals), William Douw Lighthall /22
From "'85", Barry Straton /24
Song for Canada, Charles Sangster /25
Here's to the Land (from Poems), William Wye Smith /27
Canada Not Last (from Thoughts, Moods, and Ideals), William Douw Lighthall /28
An Ode to the Canadian Confederacy (from In Divers Tones, Charles G.D. Roberts /30
Collect for Dominion Day (from In Divers Tones, Charles G.D. Roberts /32

III. The Indian
A Blood-Red Ring Hung Round the Moon, John E. Logan ("Barry Dane") /35
The Departing of Clote Scarp (from In Divers Tones), Charles G.D. Roberts /36
Change on the Ottawa (from Marguerite), George Martin /38
From "Tecumseh" (Act I, Scene 2), Charles Mair /42
The Arctic Indian's Faith (from Poems), Hon. Thomas D'Arcy McGee /44
Taapookaa: A Huron Legend (from Hesperus), Charles Sangster /45
The Caughnawaga Beadwork Seller, William Douw Lighthall /49
The Indian's Grave, Bishop George Jehoshaphat Mountain /51
Wahonomin: Indian Hymn to the Queen (from Soul's Quest), Frederick George Scott /52
Wabanaki Song, tr. Charles G. Leland /59
Wabanaki Song, tr. Charles G. Leland /60
Caughnawaga Song, tr. John Waniente Jocks / 62

IV. The Voyageur and Habitant
The Old Régime (from Song of Welcome), Mrs. J.F.W. Harrison ("Seranus") / 67
Malbrouck (Old Chanson), tr. William M'Lennan /71
A La Claire Fontaine (Old Chanson), tr. William Douw Lighthall /74
En Roulant Ma Boule (Old Chanson), tr. William M'Lennan /76
Gai le Rosier (Old Chanson), tr. William M'Lennan /78
Entre Paris et Saint-Denis (Old Chanson), tr. William M'Lennan /80
Marianson (Old Chanson), tr. William M'Lennan /83
The Resettlement of Acadia, Arthur Wentworth Eaton /87
At the Cedars, Duncan Campbell Scott /91
Rose Latulippe (A French-Canadian Legend), Mrs. J.F.W. Harrison ("Seranus") / 94
Adieu to France (from Roberval), John Hunter-Duvar /104

V. Settlement Life
Song of the Axe (from Spooks's Pass), Isabella Valancy Crawford /107
Fire in the Woods; or, the Old Settler's Story, Alexander M'Lachlan /109
Burnt Lands, Charles G.D. Roberts /114
Acres of Your Own (from Poems and Songs), Alexander M'Lachlan /115
From "Malcolm's Katie" (from Old Spooks's Pass), Isabella Valancy Crawford /117
From "Malcolm's Katie" (from Old Spooks's Pass), Isabella Valancy Crawford /119
The Second Concession of Deer (from Poems), William Wye Smith /125
The Scot Abroad (from Spring Flowers), Sir Daniel Wilson /127
The Farmer's Daughter Cherry (from Old Spooks's Pass), Isabella Valancy Crawford /129
A Canadian Folk-Song, William Wilfred Campbell /133
The Pioneers (A Ballad), William Douw Lighthall /134
"Rough Ben" (North-west Rebellion Incident), Kate B. Simpson /136
"The Injun" (Incident of Minnesota Massacre), John E. Logan ("Barry Dane") /142
Shakespeer at Dead-Hos' Crick (A North-west Romance), John E. Logan ("Barry Dane") /148

VI. Sports and Free Life
The Wraith of the Red Swan, Bliss Carman /157
Birch and Paddle (from In Divers Tones), Charles G.D. Roberts /163
The Nor-West Courier, John E. Logan ("Barry Dane") /166
The Hall of Shadows (from Poems and Songs), Alexander M'Lachlan /168
Canadian Hunter's Song, Mrs. Susanna (Strickland) Moodie /172
Canadian Camping Song, James D. Edgar /173
The Fisherman's Light (A Song of the Backwoods), Mrs. Susanna  (Strickland) Moodie /174
The Kingfisher, Charles Lee Barnes /175
The Canoe (from Old Spooks's Pass), Isabella Valancy Crawford /177
Canoe Song (from Old Spooks's Pass), Isabella Valancy Crawford /178
The Walker of the Snow, Charles Dawson Shanly /181
In the Shadows, E. Pauline Johnson /184
On the Creek (from In Divers Tones), Charles G.D. Roberts /187
The Rapid (St. Lawrence), Charles Sangster /190
The Winter Spirit (Origin of the Ice Palace), Helen Fairbairn /192
Snowshoeing Song, Arthur Weir /195
Skating, John Lowry Stuart /197
The Winter Carnival, John Reade /199
The Spirit of the Carnival, "Fleurance" /203
The Football Match, Anonymous /209

VII. The Spirit of Canadian History
Jacques Cartier (from Poems), Hon. Thomas D'Arcy McGee /213
L'Isle St. Croix, Arthur Wentworth Eaton /216
The Captured Flag (from Fleur de Lys) Arthur Weir /219
How Canada Was Saved, George Murray /222
Madeleine de Verchères, John Reade /228
The Battle of La Prairie (A Ballad), William Douw Lighthall /233
The Battle of Grand Pré, M.J. Katzmann Lawson /236
Spina Christi (from Canadian Idylls), William Kirby /240
The Loyalists (from Laura Secord), Sarah Anne Curzon /253
Brock (from Hesperus), Charles Sangster /254
Capture of Fort Detroit, 1812, Charles Edwin Jakeway /256
Tecumseh's Death (from Tecumseh), Major Richardson /260
A Ballad for Brave Women,Charles Mair /262
In the North-West, William Wilfred Campbell /267
The Veteran, J.A. Fraser /269
In Hospital, Annie Rothwell /270
In Memoriam (from The Soul's Quest), Frederick George Scott /275

VIII. Places
The Tantramar Revisited (from In Divers Tones), Charles G.D. Roberts /279
Low Tide on Grand Pré, Bliss Carman /283
The Indian Names of Acadia, attributed to DeMille /285
On Leaving the Coast of Nova Scotia, George Frederick Cameron /287
The Fairies in Prince Edward Island, John Hunter-Duvar /288
The Vale of the Gaspereau (from Masque of Minstrels), Arthur J. Lockhart /290
In the Afternoon (from In Divers Tones), Charles G.D. Roberts /291
A Dream Fulfilled, Barry Straton /294
The Isle of Demons (from Marguerite), George Martin /297
The Secret of the Saguenay (from Fleur de Lys), Arthur Weir /303
Saguenay, L.H. Fréchette, tr. J.D. Edgar /306
Quebec (from St. Lawrence and Saguenay), Charles Sangster /307
Montreal, William M'Lennan /308
Montreal, William Douw Lighthall /309
The St. Lawrence, K.L. Jones /310
Night in the Thousand Isles (from St. Lawrence and Saguenay), Charles Sangster /312
Ottawa, Duncan Campbell Scott /314
At the Ferry, E. Pauline Johnson /315
Niagara, William Kirby /317
Lake Couchiching, W.A. Sherwood /320
The Heart of the Lakes (from Lake Lyrics), William Wilfred Campbell /321
Vapour and Blue (from Lake Lyrics), William Wilfred Campbell /322
Medwayosh (from Lake Lyrics), William Wilfred Campbell /323
Manitou (from Lake Lyrics), William Wilfred Campbell /324
To the Lakes (from Lake Lyrics), William Wilfred Campbell /326
The Legend of Restless River (from Lake Lyrics), William Wilfred Campbell /327
Morning on the Beach (from Lake Lyrics), William Wilfred Campbell /330
Dawn in the Island Camp (from Lake Lyrics), William Wilfred Campbell /331
Lake Huron (from Lake Lyrics), William Wilfred Campbell /332
Indian Summer (from Lake Lyrics), William Wilfred Campbell /333
Sault Ste. Marie (from Poems of the Heart and Home), Pamelia Vining Yule /334
Le Lac des Morts (from Songs of the Wilderness), Bishop George J. Mountain /337
The Buffalo Plains (from Tecumseh, Act IV, Scene 7), Charles Mair /339
The Last Bison, Charles Mair /342
A Prairie Year (from Eos: A Prairie Dream), Nicholas Flood Davin /349
The Laurentides (from Western Life), H.R.A. Pocock /352
The Legend of Thunder (from Western Life), H.R.A. Pocock /357

IX. Seasons
Heat (from In the Millet), Archibald Lampman /369
To a Humming-bird in a Garden, George Murray /371
In the Golden Birch, Elizabeth Gostwycke Roberts /374
The Fir Woods, Charles G.D. Roberts /376
Clouds (from In the Millet), Archibald Lampman /377
Frogs, Charles G.D. Roberts /378
Twilight (from Jephthah's Daughter), Charles Heavysege /379
The Whip-Poor-Will, "Fidelis" /380
A Canadian Summer Evening (from Poems), Mrs. Leprohon /382
Evening on the Marshes, Barry Straton /383
The Fire-Flies (from Dreamland), Charles Mair /385
Midsummer Night (from In the Millet), Archibald Lampman /387
The Autumn Tree (from Jephthah's Daughter), Charles Heavysege /388
In Apple Time, Bliss Carman /389
The Aurora Borealis, John E. Logan ("Barry Dane") /390
The Maple (from Orion), Charles G.D. Roberts /391
October (from Poems and Songs), Alexander M'Lachlan /392
First Snow, Jean-Talon L'Espérance ("Laclède") /394
Indian Summer, Mrs. Susanna (Strickland) Moodie /396
Indian Summer (from Voices from the Hearth), Isidore G. Ascher /397
An Indian Summer Carol, "Fidelis" /399
To Winter (from Orion), Charles G.D. Roberts /401
A Mid-Winter Night's Dream (from Snowflakes and Sunbeams), William Wilfred Campbell /404
Winter Night (from Jephthah's Daughter), Charles Heavysege /405
Carnations in Winter, Bliss Carman /406
Icicle Drops, Arthur John Lockhart /407
The Silver Frost, Barry Straton /409
The Jewelled Trees, George Martin /411
March (from Old Spooks's Pass), Isabella Valancy Crawford /413
The Winds, John E. Logan ("Barry Lane") /417
April (from In the Millet), Archibald Lampman /421
In Lyric Season, Bliss Carman /424
An Old Lesson from the Fields (from In the Millet), Archibald Lampman /425
The Frogs (from In the Millet), Archibald Lampman /426
Bobolink (from Poems and Songs), Alexander M'Lachlan /429
The Canadian Song-Sparrow, J.D. Edgar /431
In June, E.W. Thomson /432

Appendix
 I. The Old Chansons of the French Province /437
 II. Leading Modern French-Canadian Poets /440
Notes Biographical and Bibliographical /449
Note of Thanks /464

References

External links
 Songs of the Great Dominion on Google Books
 Canadian Literature at Home and Abroad. International Contexts of W.D. Lighthall’s Songs of the Great Dominion 1889 and Robert Weaver’s Canadian Short Stories 1960. In: Studies in Canadian Literature -, Vol. 41, 2, 2016, by Carole Gerson

1889 books
Canadian poetry collections
Poetry anthologies
Canadian anthologies